Hochdorf is a municipality in the district of Esslingen in Baden-Württemberg in southern Germany.
Mayor: 1986 - 31.3.2009: Roland Erhardt, since 1.4.2009: Gerhart Kuttler

Hochdorf is situated about 30 km southeast of Stuttgart in the northwestern foothills of the Swabian Jura and just south of the Schurwald. The municipality extends between Plochingen (west) and Kirchheim unter Teck (south) in the valley of the Talbach, shortly before it converges with the Fils.

Neighboring communities
Adjacent municipalities are Ebersbach (Göppingen district) in the east, Notzingen in the south, Wernau in the West, Plochingen in the northwest and Reichenbach an der Fils in the north (all Esslingen district).

View from Hochdorf

Municipality arrangement
Hochdorf includes Hochdorf and the house Ziegelhof and the Abandoned village Hinterburg.

History

Hochdorf was first mentioned in 1189, but is probably originated in the 5th century. Until 1454 the place was owned by various monasteries, then it belonged to Württemberg.
Within Württemberg Hochdorf first belonged to Oberamt Kirchheim and since 1485 to Oberamt Göppingen. In 1842 was the reincorporation to Kirchheim, where the city remained until the reorganization of the districts 1938. Since then Hochdorf belongs to the district of Esslingen.

Religions
Since the Reformation Hochdorf is predominantly Protestant coined.

Economy

Grimm's Spiel und Holz Design, toy manufacturer

Education
Since the 1970s, there is only a primary school in Hochdorf, the Breitwies school. Schools are visited in the neighboring villages. There are two kindergartens in the municipality for the young children. The children's and youth library contains a stock of 4,000 media.

Natural monuments
Linde Group (three Tilia cordata)
Kreuzeiche (victim of the 1999 hurricane Lothar)
the Talbach (valley stream) with the Mühlkanal (mill channel)

Regular events
Martini market
Music club festival (several days)
Farmer's market
Festival of lights
Fire department festival
Riding festival

Freeman
Heinrich Traub, former mayor

Sons and daughters of the town
Gottlieb Fischer (1867–1926), Member of Parliament

Personalities who were active in Hochdorf 
Hans Blickensdörfer (1923–1997), sports journalist and writer, lived  in Hochdorf
Rüdiger Kauf (born 1975), professional football player for VfB Stuttgart and Arminia Bielefeld played in his youth with TV Hochdorf
Siegmar Mosdorf, (born 1952), politician (SPD), Member of Parliament (1990–2002) and Parliamentary Secretary to the Federal Minister of Economics and Technology (1998–2002), co-founder and longtime head of the community foundation Hochdorf
Susanne Weber-Mosdorf, (born 1953), politician (SPD), Deputy Director General of the World Health Organization (2006–2011), co-founder of the Community Foundation Hochdorf, lives in Hochdorf

Literature
 Erich Roos: Dorf-Chronik Hochdorf 1900–1950. Geiger, Horb 2001, .
 Gemeinde Hochdorf (Hrsg.), Christof Drüppel: Hochdorf – Geschichte einer Gemeinde im Albvorland. Jan Thorbecke Verlag, Sigmaringen 1989.
 Gemeinde Hochdorf (Hrsg.): Hochdorf in Bildern – Vorgestern, Gestern und Heute. Geiger, Horb 1982.
 Der Landkreis Esslingen (Band 2). Hrsg. vom Landesarchiv Baden-Württemberg i. V. mit dem Landkreis Esslingen, Jan Thorbecke Verlag, Ostfildern 2009, Seite 17.

References

Esslingen (district)